Abdul Hamid (2 January 1950, Chapar, Dhubri district, Assam) is a leader of Indian National Congress from Assam. He served as member of the Lok Sabha representing Dhubri (Lok Sabha constituency). He was elected to 8th, 12th and 13th Lok Sabha.

References

India MPs 1999–2004
People from Dhubri district
1950 births
Living people
Indian National Congress politicians from Assam
India MPs 1984–1989
India MPs 1998–1999
Lok Sabha members from Assam